Spilopelia is a genus of doves that are closely related to Streptopelia, yet distinguished from them by differences in morphology and behavior. Some authors have argued that Stigmatopelia is the valid name as it appears in an earlier line although also erected by the Swedish zoologist Carl Sundevall, but Richard Schodde and Ian J. Mason in their zoological catalogue of Australian birds chose Spilopelia citing clause 24(b) of the International Code of Zoological Nomenclature (ICZN) which supports the decision of the first reviser. The name Spilopelia combines the Ancient Greek spilos meaning "spot" and peleia meaning "dove".

Species
The genus includes just two species:

 Spotted dove, Spilopelia chinensis
 Laughing dove, Spilopelia senegalensis
Some ornithologists split the spotted dove into the eastern spotted dove (Spilopelia chinensis) and the western spotted dove (Spilopelia suratensis).

Notes

References

 
Bird genera